Sid Rogell (January 16, 1900 – November 15, 1973) was an American film producer. He became RKO's production chief in 1948 following Dore Schary's departure but only lasted two years. He was the nephew of the director Albert S. Rogell. He was married to the actress June Clayworth.

Selected filmography
 Among the Missing (1934)
 Name the Woman (1934)
 The Line-Up (1934)
 The Hell Cat (1934)
 Unknown Woman (1935)
 Murder, My Sweet (1944)
 The Devil Thumbs a Ride (1947)
 Born to Kill (1947)
 The Big Steal (1949)
 Payment on Demand (1951)
 The Company She Keeps (1951)
 My Forbidden Past (1951)
 On Dangerous Ground (1951)
 The Pace That Thrills (1952)
 At Sword's Point (1952)

References

Bibliography
 Edmund G. Bansak. Fearing the Dark: The Val Lewton Career. McFarland, 2003.

External links

1900 births
1973 deaths
American film producers
Film producers from Missouri
American film studio executives
20th-century American Jews
Burials at Hillside Memorial Park Cemetery
People from St. Joseph, Missouri
20th-century American businesspeople